Master Tracks is a Canadian television series where an emerging band is given one day to record a song with acclaimed producers Moe Berg and Laurence Currie.  It was launched on aux.tv, a Canadian music website, and BiteTV, a digital cable channel, in March 2009 and currently airs on both.  The show aims to provide viewers with a behind-the-scenes look at how records are produced while profiling new and emerging artists.

Originally airing a preview of its first five episode on Bite TV, it now airs on Aux TV.  The channel was launched on October 1, 2009 exclusively on Rogers Cable, with plans to launch on other providers in the future.

Location 
The show is filmed entirely in one of North America's premier studios, Metalworks Studios in Mississauga, Ontario Canada.  The studio that is used to record the songs on the show is studio 6, and is the studio that is primarily shown.  The show has also shot interview segments in other studios throughout Metal Works.

Episodes

References

 Master Tracks
 Master Tracks

2009 Canadian television series debuts
2000s Canadian music television series
2010s Canadian music television series